The 1909–10 Cornell Big Red men's ice hockey season was the 9th season of play for the program.

Season
After being rejected the year before, Cornell was admitted to the Intercollegiate Hockey Association. Unfortunately, warm weather prevented the Big Red from playing any home games for the second year in a row. In order to help the team live up to expectations, Talbot Hunter was hired as head coach and began working with the team on January 1.

Cornell opened its season with a three-game series versus Yale in Cleveland. The Elis won the first two matched but Cornell fought back to claim the third contest. The Big Red began the IHA season two days later, losing to Princeton and Harvard in quick succession. Cornell had to wait until February to continue their season but the break allowed the gain their second wind and defeat Yale for their first ever conference victory. The game against Columbia was postponed for two weeks but when it was finally played the Big Red hadn't lost any of their steam and evened their conference record to 2–2. Cornell was supposed to play Dartmouth on February 9 but that game was postponed indefinitely. Attempts were made to have the game played later but with neither team in contention for the championship the game was eventually cancelled.

Despite the rough start to the IHA season Cornell finished strong and hopes were high for the following year.

F. S. Bosworth served as team manager.

Roster

Standings

Schedule and Results

|-
!colspan=12 style=";" | Regular Season

References

Cornell Big Red men's ice hockey seasons
Cornell
Cornell
Cornell
Cornell